The Avenue of the Saints Amphitheater is an outdoor event space in St. Charles, Iowa.

The venue opened in 2013, and has a maximum capacity of 18,000.

References

Music venues in Iowa